Gold Nanocages are hollow, porous gold nanoparticles ranging in size from 10 to over 150 nm.  They are created by reacting silver nanoparticles with chloroauric acid (HAuCl4) in boiling water. Whereas gold nanoparticles absorb light in the visible spectrum of light (at about 550 nm), gold nanocages absorb light in the near-infrared, where biological tissues absorb the least light.  Because they are also biocompatible, gold nanocages are promising as a contrast agent for optical coherence tomography. Gold nanocages also absorb light and heat up (Photothermal effect), killing surrounding cancer cells.  Nanocages have been functionalized with cancer-specific antibodies.

See also 

 Colloidal gold
 Gold nanorods

References

Nanoparticles by composition
Nanoparticles by morphology